Mohanpur railway station is a railway station on the Jasidih–Dumka–Rampurhat line under the Asansol railway division of the Eastern Railway. It is situated at Katban Chhit, Mohanpur, Deoghar, Deoghar district in the Indian state of Jharkhand.

History
Jasidih Junction to Dumka railway line became operational on 12 July 2011 and Dumka to  track was set up in June 2014. The track from Rampurhat to Pinargaria became operational on 25 November 2012. The complete single railway route from Dumka to Rampurhat, including Mohanpur railway station became operational on 4 June 2015.

Further extension
The -long Jasidih–Hansdiha–Pirpainti line is under construction. As of March 2021, work is under progress on Mohanpur–Hansdiha and Godda–Pirpainti sections. Hansdiha–Godda section has been completed and a proposal for Humsafar Express from Godda to New Delhi is under consideration. This line is considered important to connect the Godda district in the Santhal Pargana division of Jharkhand with the rest of India. The  Godda–Pakur line is also planned.

References

Asansol railway division
Railway stations in Deoghar district